Idris Shaaba Jimada is a Nigerian academic and the Director of Arewa House in Kaduna. He is a professor of history and the deputy dean of the Faculty of Arts at Ahmadu Bello University.

Biography
Jimada hails from Kwara State. He earned an MA and PhD from Ahmadu Bello University. His research focuses on intergroup relations and contemporary and comparative national and international studies on political and social movements.

Jimada was appointed Director of Arewa House to replace Professor Sule Bello. Arewa House is the former state house of the northern Nigeria region and the residence of Premier Sir Ahmadu Bello. It is now the headquarters for historical research and documentations for Ahmadu Bello University.

See also
List of Hausa people

References

Living people
Nigerian academic administrators
Ahmadu Bello University people
1984 births
People from Kwara State